The Kurgan hypothesis (also known as the Kurgan theory, Kurgan model, or steppe theory) is the most widely accepted proposal to identify the Proto-Indo-European homeland from which the Indo-European languages spread out throughout Europe and parts of Asia. It postulates that the people of a Kurgan culture in the Pontic steppe north of the Black Sea were the most likely speakers of the Proto-Indo-European language (PIE). The term is derived from the Russian kurgan, meaning tumulus or burial mound.

The steppe theory was first formulated by Otto Schrader (1883) and V. Gordon Childe (1926), then systematized in the 1950s by Marija Gimbutas, who used the term to group various prehistoric cultures, including the Yamnaya (or Pit Grave) culture and its predecessors. In the 2000s, David Anthony instead used the core Yamnaya culture and its relationship with other cultures as a point of reference.

Gimbutas defined the Kurgan culture as composed of four successive periods, with the earliest (Kurgan I) including the Samara and Seroglazovo cultures of the Dnieper–Volga region in the Copper Age (early 4th millennium BC). The people of these cultures were nomadic pastoralists, who, according to the model, by the early 3rd millennium BC had expanded throughout the Pontic–Caspian steppe and into Eastern Europe.

Recent genetics studies have demonstrated that populations bearing specific Y-DNA haplogroups and a distinct genetic signature expanded into Europe and South Asia from the Pontic-Caspian steppe during the third and second millennia BC. These migrations provide a plausible explanation for the spread of at least some of the Indo-European languages, and suggest that the alternative Anatolian hypothesis, which places the Proto-Indo-European homeland in Neolithic Anatolia, is less likely to be correct.

History

Predecessors
Theodor Poesche had proposed the nearby Pinsk Marshes. In his standard work about PIE and to a greater extent in a later abbreviated version, Karl Brugmann took the view that the urheimat could not be identified exactly by the scholarship of his time, but he tended toward Schrader's view. However, after Karl Penka's 1883 rejection of non-European PIE origins, most scholars favoured a Northern European origin.

The view of a Pontic origin was still strongly supported, including by the archaeologists V. Gordon Childe and Ernst Wahle. One of Wahle's students was Jonas Puzinas, who became one of Marija Gimbutas's teachers. Gimbutas, who acknowledged Schrader as a precursor, painstakingly marshalled a wealth of archaeological evidence from the territory of the Soviet Union and the Eastern Bloc that was not readily available to Western scholars, revealing a fuller picture of prehistoric Europe.

Overview
When it was first proposed in 1956, in The Prehistory of Eastern Europe, Part 1, Gimbutas's contribution to the search for Indo-European origins was an interdisciplinary synthesis of archaeology and linguistics. The Kurgan model of Indo-European origins identifies the Pontic–Caspian steppe as the Proto-Indo-European (PIE) urheimat, and a variety of late PIE dialects are assumed to have been spoken across this region. According to this model, the Kurgan culture gradually expanded to the entire Pontic–Caspian steppe, Kurgan IV being identified with the Yamnaya culture of around 3000 BC.

The mobility of the Kurgan culture facilitated its expansion over the entire region and is attributed to the domestication of the horse followed by the use of early chariots. The first strong archaeological evidence for the domestication of the horse comes from the Sredny Stog culture north of the Azov Sea in Ukraine, and would correspond to an early PIE or pre-PIE nucleus of the 5th millennium BC. Subsequent expansion beyond the steppes led to hybrid, or in Gimbutas's terms "kurganized" cultures, such as the Globular Amphora culture to the west. From these kurganized cultures came the immigration of Proto-Greeks to the Balkans and the nomadic Indo-Iranian cultures to the east around 2500 BC.

Kurgan culture

Cultural horizon
Gimbutas defined and introduced the term "Kurgan culture" in 1956 with the intention of introducing a "broader term" that would combine Sredny Stog II, Pit Grave, and Corded ware horizons (spanning the 4th to 3rd millennia in much of Eastern and Northern Europe). The Kurgan  archaeological culture or cultural horizon comprises the various cultures of the Pontic–Caspian steppe in the Copper Age to Early Bronze Age (5th to 3rd millennia BC), identified by similar artifacts and structures, but subject to inevitable imprecision and uncertainty. The eponymous kurgans (mound graves) are only one among several common features.

Cultures that Gimbutas considered as part of the "Kurgan culture":
Bug–Dniester (6th millennium)
Samara (5th millennium)
Khvalynsk (5th millennium)
Dnieper–Donets (5th to 4th millennia)
Sredny Stog (mid-5th to mid-4th millennia)
Maikop–Deriivka (mid-4th to mid-3rd millennia)
Yamnaya (Pit Grave): This is itself a varied cultural horizon, spanning the entire Pontic–Caspian steppe from the mid-4th to the 3rd millennium.
Usatovo culture (late 4th millennium)

Stages of culture and expansion

Gimbutas's original suggestion identifies four successive stages of the Kurgan culture:
 Kurgan I, Dnieper/Volga region, earlier half of the 4th millennium BC. Apparently evolving from cultures of the Volga basin, subgroups include the Samara and Seroglazovo cultures.
 Kurgan II–III, latter half of the 4th millennium BC. Stone circles, anthropomorphic stone stelae of deities. Includes the Sredny Stog culture and the Maykop culture of the northern Caucasus. 
 Kurgan IV or Pit Grave (Yamnaya) culture, first half of the 3rd millennium BC, encompassing the entire steppe region from the Ural to Romania.

In other publications she proposes three successive "waves" of expansion:
 Wave 1, predating Kurgan I, expansion from the lower Volga to the Dnieper, leading to coexistence of Kurgan I and the Cucuteni–Trypillia culture. Repercussions of the migrations extend as far as the Balkans and along the Danube to the Vinča culture in Serbia and Lengyel culture in Hungary.
Wave 2, mid 4th millennium BC, originating in the Maykop culture and resulting in advances of "kurganized" hybrid cultures into northern Europe around 3000 BC (Globular Amphora culture, Baden culture, and ultimately Corded Ware culture). According to Gimbutas this corresponds to the first intrusion of Indo-European languages into western and northern Europe.
Wave 3, 3000–2800 BC, expansion of the Pit Grave culture beyond the steppes, with the appearance of the characteristic pit graves as far as modern Romania, Bulgaria, eastern Hungary and Georgia, coincident with the end of the Cucuteni–Trypillia culture and Trialeti culture in Georgia (c. 2750 BC).

Timeline
4500–4000: Early PIE. Sredny Stog, Dnieper–Donets and Samara cultures, domestication of the horse (Wave 1).
4000–3500: The Pit Grave culture (a.k.a. Yamnaya culture), the prototypical kurgan builders, emerges in the steppe, and the Maykop culture in the northern Caucasus. Indo-Hittite models postulate the separation of Proto-Anatolian before this time.
3500–3000: Middle PIE. The Pit Grave culture is at its peak, representing the classical reconstructed Proto-Indo-European society with stone idols, predominantly practicing animal husbandry in permanent settlements protected by hillforts, subsisting on agriculture, and fishing along rivers. Contact of the Pit Grave culture with late Neolithic Europe cultures results in the "kurganized" Globular Amphora and Baden cultures (Wave 2). The Maykop culture shows the earliest evidence of the beginning Bronze Age, and Bronze weapons and artifacts are introduced to Pit Grave territory. Probable early Satemization.
3000–2500: Late PIE. The Pit Grave culture extends over the entire Pontic steppe (Wave 3). The Corded Ware culture extends from the Rhine to the Volga, corresponding to the latest phase of Indo-European unity, the vast "kurganized" area disintegrating into various independent languages and cultures, still in loose contact enabling the spread of technology and early loans between the groups, except for the Anatolian and Tocharian branches, which are already isolated from these processes. The centum–satem break is probably complete, but the phonetic trends of Satemization remain active.

Further expansion during the Bronze Age

The Kurgan hypothesis describes the initial spread of Proto-Indo-European during the 5th and 4th millennia BC. As used by Gimbutas, the term "kurganized" implied that the culture could have been spread by no more than small bands who imposed themselves on local people as an elite. This idea of PIE and its daughter languages diffusing east and west without mass movement proved popular with archaeologists in the 1970s (the pots-not-people paradigm). The question of further Indo-Europeanization of Central and Western Europe, Central Asia and Northern India during the Bronze Age is beyond the scope of the Kurgan hypothesis, and far more uncertain than the events of the Copper Age, and subject to some controversy. The rapidly developing fields of archaeogenetics and genetic genealogy since the late 1990s have not only confirmed a migratory pattern out of the Pontic Steppe at the relevant time but also suggest the possibility that the population movement involved was more substantial than earlier anticipated and invasive.

Revisions

Invasion versus diffusion scenarios (1980s onward) 
Gimbutas believed that the expansions of the Kurgan culture were a series of essentially-hostile military incursions in which a new warrior culture imposed itself on the peaceful, matrilinear, and matrifocal (but not matriarchal) cultures of "Old Europe" and replaced it with a patriarchal warrior society, a process visible in the appearance of fortified settlements and hillforts and the graves of warrior-chieftains:

In her later life, Gimbutas increasingly emphasized the authoritarian nature of this transition from the egalitarian society centered on the nature/earth mother goddess (Gaia) to a patriarchy worshipping the father/sun/weather god (Zeus, Dyaus).

J. P. Mallory (in 1989) accepted the Kurgan hypothesis as the de facto standard theory of Indo-European origins, but he distinguished it from an implied "radical" scenario of military invasion. Gimbutas's actual main scenario involved slow accumulation of influence through coercion or extortion, as distinguished from general raiding shortly followed by conquest:

Alignment with Anatolian hypothesis (2000s)

In the 2000s, Alberto Piazza and Luigi Luca Cavalli-Sforza tried to align the Anatolian hypothesis with the steppe theory. According to Piazza, "[i]t is clear that, genetically speaking, peoples of the Kurgan steppe descended at least in part from people of the Middle Eastern Neolithic who immigrated there from Anatolia." According to Piazza and Cavalli-Sforza (2006), the Yamna-culture may have been derived from Middle Eastern Neolithic farmers who migrated to the Pontic steppe and developed pastoral nomadism. Wells agrees with Cavalli-Sforza that there is "some genetic evidence for migration from the Middle East." Nevertheless, the Anatolian hypothesis is incompatible with the linguistic evidence.

Anthony's revised steppe theory (2007)
David Anthony's The Horse, the Wheel and Language describes his "revised steppe theory". He considers the term "Kurgan culture" so imprecise as to be useless, and instead uses the core Yamnaya culture and its relationship with other cultures as points of reference. He points out:

He does not include the Maykop culture among those that he considers to be Indo-European-speaking and presumes instead that they spoke a Caucasian language.

See also
Hamangia culture 
Animal sacrifice
Ashvamedha
Shaft tomb
Revised Kurgan theory
Germanic substrate hypothesis

Genetics
 Archaeogenetics of Europe
 Haplogroup R1a
 Lactase persistence

Competing hypotheses
Proto-Indo-European Urheimat hypotheses
Armenian hypothesis
Anatolian hypothesis
Out of India theory
Paleolithic continuity theory

References

Bibliography

 

.
.

.

 

.

External links
 Humanjourney.us, The Indo-Europeans

1956 in science
1956 introductions
Historical linguistics
Indo-European studies
Proto-Indo-Europeans
Nomadic groups in Eurasia
Stone Age Europe
Archaeological theory
Horse history and evolution
Indo-European